A monkey model is a military piece of equipment designed by the Soviet military for export uses only.

Monkey model can also refer to:

 An animal model of disease or toxicology developed by experimentation with, or observation of monkeys